Prince Arthur may refer to:

Arthur I, Duke of Brittany (1187-1203), nephew and possible heir of Richard I of England
Arthur, Prince of Wales (1486–1502), eldest son Henry VII of England
Prince Arthur, Duke of Connaught and Strathearn (1850–1942), third son of Queen Victoria of the United Kingdom
Prince Arthur of Connaught (1883–1938), the only son of the above Prince Arthur
King Arthur also features as "Prince Arthur" in some works, as in Richard Blackmore's epic Prince Arthur, an Heroick Poem in X Books and Edmund Spenser's The Faerie Queen
, a paddle steamer in service 1867–1885
 , operated by the Hudson's Bay Company from 1854–1864, see Hudson's Bay Company vessels